Diana Extended: The Remixes is a remix album released by American soul singer Diana Ross in 1994. The album includes six tracks that were reworked by some of the biggest names in the industry at the time, covering Ross' career as a solo artist and as a member of The Supremes, with Frankie Knuckles updating "Someday We'll Be Together" from 1969. The album also contains a remix of "Chain Reaction", originally released during Ross' time at RCA. The seventh track is "You're Gonna Love It", a track from the album The Force Behind the Power. The version on Diana Extended: The Remixes is a short remix available previously on a 12" single.

The album was only moderately successful on both sides of the Atlantic, reaching #58 on the UK Albums Chart and #68 on the US Top R&B/Hip-Hop Albums, while missing the Billboard Top 200 entirely. "Someday We'll Be Together" was released as a single and peaked at #7 on the Hot Dance Music/Club Play charts (April 1994). The album ultimately sold around 80,000 copies in the US.

The US version of the album was released on Motown, and European/Japanese versions on EMI. Track listings were the same, but special editions were also issued. Many remixes, including those by Joey Negro, weren't included on the album but instead only on the many singles released for the club market.

Track listings and formats
US, UK CD/ 12"Vinyl Maxi-single
"The Boss" (David Morales Remix) – 6:31
"Love Hangover" (Frankie Knuckles Remix) – 8:24
"Upside Down" (David Morales & Satoshi Tomiie) – 8:06
"Someday We'll Be Together" (Frankie Knuckles Remix) – 8:46
"Chain Reaction" (Dewey B & Spike) – 6:15
"You're Gonna Love It" (E-Smoove & Steve 'Silk' Hurley Remix) – 4:24
"I'm Coming Out" (Maurice's Club Remix) – 8:08

US, UK 12"Vinyl Limited Ed. Double LP
A1. "The Boss" (David Morales Remix) – 6:27
A2. "Someday We'll Be Together" (Frankie Knuckles Def Mix) – 8:43
A3. "I'm Coming Out" (Maurice Club Mix) – 8:07
B1. "Upside Down" (David Morales Down Under Mix) – 8:04
B2. "Love Hangover" (Frankie Knuckles Classic Mix) – 8:20
B3. "Love Hangover" (Frank Knuckles Tribal Reprise Remix) – 5:23
C1. "Someday We'll Be Together" (Frankie Knuckles Dub Remix) – 6:57
C2. "The Boss (David Morales Dub Remix) – 6:55
C3. "Upside Down" (Satoshi Tomiie & David Morales Dub Part 1) – 7:42
D1. "The Boss" (David Morales BYC Remix) – 11:06
D2. "I'm Coming Out" (Maurice's Monstrumental Remix) – 8:02

Singles

Your Love

UK CD 1 Maxi-single
"Your Love" – 4:04
Missing You" – 4:03
"Love Hangover" (Frankie Knuckles Tribal Hangover Remix) – 9:30
"When You Tell Me That You Love Me" – 4:10
UK CD 2 Maxi-single
"Your Love" – 04:05
"Upside Down" (Satoshi Tomiie & David Morales Remix) – 08:06
"Someday We'll Be Together" (Frankie Knuckles Remix) – 08:45
"Chain Reaction" – 03:46

US, UK 12"Vinyl promo
A1."Love Hangover (Tribal Hangover)" – 9:26
A2."Love Hangover (Classic Club)" – 8:20
B1."Love Hangover (Tribal Reprise)" – 5:25
B2."Your Love" – 3:58
US, UK 12"Vinyl single 
A1."Upside Down ('93 Remix) " – 8:00
A2."Upside Down (Dub 2) " – 7:37
B1."Someday We'll Be Together ('93 Remix)" – 8:40
B2."Someday We'll Be Together (Final Sound Factory)" – 6:54

Why Do Fools Fall in Love
UK 12"Vinyl single
A1."I'm Coming Out" (K.O.K. club mix)
A2."I'm Coming Out" (Daybreak mix)
B1."The Boss" (Morales club mix)
B2."Why Do Fools Fall in Love"

I'm Coming Out

UK 12" Vinyl promo-only (Remixes)
A1."I'm Coming Out" (K.O.K. Club Mix) – 9:10
A2."I'm Coming Out" (Daybreak Mix) – 5:40
B1."The Boss"(Morales Club Mix) – 11:07
B2."The Boss" (Dub) – 6:55

France CD Maxi-single (Remixes)
"I'm Coming Out" (7" Mix) – 4:03
"I'm Coming Out" (K.O.K Club Mix) – 9:10
"I'm Coming Out" (Extended 12" Mix) – 6:00
"I'm Coming Out" (Daybreak Mix) – 6:00

Someday We'll Be Together
US 12" Maxi-single  
A1."Someday We'll Be Together" (Radio Edit) – 3:04
A2."Someday We'll Be Together" (Def Mix) – 8:42
B1."Someday We'll Be Together" (Soundfactory Mix) – 6:57

The Best Years of My Life
UK CD Maxi-single / UK 12" Vinyl promo-only
"The Best Years of My Life"
"Upside Down" ('93 Remix)
"Upside Down" (Morales Dub)
"You Can't Hurry Love"

The Boss/I'm Coming Out
US CD Maxi-promo
"The Boss" (Radio edit) – 4:00
"I'm Coming Out" (Radio edit) – 3:45
"The Boss" (EP version) – 6:27
"I'm Coming Out" (EP version) – 8:07
"I'm Coming Out" (Bonus beats) 2:00

Charts

References

1994 remix albums
Motown remix albums
Diana Ross remix albums
House music remix albums